José Domingo Salcedo González (born 9 November 1983 in Fernando de la Mora) is a retired Paraguayan football midfielder and current head coach of Cerro Porteño's reserve team.

Career

Club career

Salcedo started his career with Paraguayan club Cerro Porteño, before signing for Argentine Racing Club de Avellaneda in 2007. In January 2008 Salcedo signed for Colo-Colo of Chile. Salcedo is one of Colo-Colo's most expensive acquisitions, costing Colo-Colo more than $1 million, third only below to Lucas Barrios with $2 million and Macnelly Torres who cost the club $2.4 million.

In 2010 Salcedo returned to Cerro Porteño.

International career
In June 2007, he was selected for the Paraguay national football team that competed in the 2007 Copa América.

Coaching career
On 9 October 2019 it was confirmed, that Salcedo would retire and continue as an assistant coach to interim head coach Víctor Bernay at his former club, Cerro Porteño, for the rest of the season. A new head coach was hired at the end of the year, and Salcedo continued as head coach for the club's reserve team for 2020.

Personal life
Domingo is the brother of Paraguayan footballer Santiago Salcedo.

Honours

Club
Colo-Colo
 Primera División de Chile (2): 2008 Clausura, 2009 Clausura

References

External links

1983 births
Living people
Paraguayan footballers
Paraguayan expatriate footballers
Paraguay international footballers
Cerro Porteño players
Racing Club de Avellaneda footballers
Colo-Colo footballers
Club Rubio Ñu footballers
Deportivo Capiatá players
Club Atlético 3 de Febrero players
Club Libertad footballers
Club Sol de América footballers
Club Sportivo San Lorenzo footballers
Paraguayan Primera División players
Chilean Primera División players
Argentine Primera División players
Association football defenders 
Association football midfielders
Paraguayan expatriate sportspeople in Argentina
Paraguayan expatriate sportspeople in Chile
Expatriate footballers in Argentina
Expatriate footballers in Chile
Deportivo Capiatá managers